The Glasgow Central by-election, in the Glasgow Central constituency, was held on 15 June 1989. It was caused by the death of the sitting Member of Parliament, Bob McTaggart.

The Scottish National Party had high hopes of repeating their victory from the previous year at the by-election for the Glasgow Govan seat, where Jim Sillars gained the seat from Labour. For Glasgow Central, the SNP chose a close associate of their Govan victor Alex Neil. However, the hope for victory did not transpire for the SNP, as Mike Watson retained the seat for the Labour Party with a 6,462 majority, despite a 20.3% rise in the SNP share of the votes cast. The day after the election, The Glasgow Herald described the result as "the revenge" Labour sought for their by-election defeat in Govan a few months earlier. The SNP blamed opinion polls in the latter stages of the election campaign which showed them trailing Labour, arguing these stalled their momentum. Winner Mike Watson argued that the result showed that "The SNP bandwagon is off the rails", although SNP spokesman Chris McLean denied that the result was a setback, pointing out that they had significantly increased their vote share.

The Liberal Democrats fell to fifth place, the worst position achieved by a major party at any British by-election since the 1976 Walsall North by-election. This was equalled in the Henley by-election in 2008, when Labour also fell to fifth, and surpassed in the Glasgow North East by-election in 2009, when the Liberal Democrats came sixth. Their 1.6% vote share remained the lowest percentage vote for the Liberal Democrats until they entered the Conservative-Liberal Democrat Coalition in 2010, and in fact was not beaten until the South Shields by-election three years into their time in government.

This was also the only parliamentary contest engaged in by the Scottish Socialist Party that existed at the time (which should not be confused with the present day Scottish Socialist Party). Their candidate was Bill Kidd.

Results

References

See also
 Glasgow Central (UK Parliament constituency)
 Elections in Scotland
 List of United Kingdom by-elections

Glasgow Central by-election
Glasgow Central by-election
1980s elections in Scotland
Glasgow Central by-election
By-elections to the Parliament of the United Kingdom in Glasgow constituencies
1980s in Glasgow